Bulgarian law enforcement organisations are mainly subordinate to the Ministry of Interior.

Overall structure 
The structure responsible for preservation of public order and prevention of crime and citizens’ security is the National Police Directorate-General in the Ministry of Interior.

The Directorate deals with activities on protection of public order and providing security service. It also deals with VIP and goods protection outside and inside Bulgaria.

Agencies and their roles 
The National Police Service is responsible for combating general crime and supporting the operations of other law enforcement agencies, the National Investigative Service and the Central Office for Combating Organized Crime. The Police Service has criminal and financial sections and national and local offices.

The Central Office for Combating Organized Crime, also under the Ministry of Interior, collects information about national and international crimes involving criminal organizations, mainly trafficking, financial crimes, and domestic and international terrorism. The service also is a coordinating body for other police agencies.

The National Investigative Service, which is part of the judicial system and consists or investigating justices called "sledovateli" (inspectors, investigators), is the national investigative agency for serious crimes, responsible for preparing supporting evidence in criminal cases. In 2005 a new penal code shifted some of that service's caseload to the National Police Service.

The Ministry of Interior also heads the Border Police Service and the National Gendarmerie, a specialized branch for anti-terrorist activity, crisis management and riot control. In 2005 the Border Police, which underwent large-scale reform under European Union (EU) supervision in the early 2000s, had 12,000 personnel.

See also
 Crime in Bulgaria

References